Lucchesi is an Italian surname. Notable people with the surname include:

Andrea Carlo Lucchesi (1860–1924), Anglo-Italian sculptor
Andrea Luchesi, also spelled Lucchesi (1741–1801), Italian composer
Bruno Lucchesi (born 1926), Italian-American sculptor
Didier Lucchesi (born 1970), French conductor
Frank Lucchesi (1927–2019), American professional baseball player, manager and coach
Gary Lucchesi (born 1955), American film producer
Gianmarco Lucchesi (2000), Italian rugby union player
Giorgio Lucchesi (1855 – 1941), Italian painter
Giulio Maria Lucchesi (died after 1799), 18th-century Italian violinist and composer
Joey Lucchesi (born 1993), American professional baseball pitcher 
Joseph Count Lucchesi d’ Averna (died 1757), lieutenant field marshal in the Habsburg Army during the Seven Years' War
Keira Lucchesi (contemporary), Scottish actress
Matteo Lucchesi (1705–1776), Italian architect and engineer
Salvatore Lucchesi (born 1882, date of death unknown), Italian sports shooter

 Fictional characters
 Licio Lucchesi, in the 1990 American crime film The Godfather Part III

Other uses
Colline Lucchesi, a wine region in northern Tuscany, Italy
Lucchesi Park, in Petaluma, California
Santa Croce e San Bonaventura dei Lucchesi, a church in Rome, sited on via dei Lucchesi in the Trevi district

See also 
Lucca, Italian city and province, for which "Lucchesi" is the demonym
Lucchese (disambiguation)

Italian-language surnames